Gavdari-ye Qarah Ney (also Romanized as Gāvdārī-ye Qarah Ney) is a village in Kani Bazar Rural District, Khalifan District, Mahabad County, West Azerbaijan Province, Iran. At the 2006 census, its population was 49, in 7 families.

References 

Populated places in Mahabad County